Samuel Jones Nicholls (May 7, 1885 – November 23, 1937) was a United States representative from South Carolina. He was born in Spartanburg, South Carolina. He attended Bingham Military Institute in Asheville, North Carolina; Wofford College, in Spartanburg, South Carolina; Virginia Polytechnic Institute in Blacksburg, Virginia; and the University of Chicago Law School. He was admitted to the bar in 1906 and commenced practice in Spartanburg.

Nicholls was the city attorney of Spartanburg and prosecuting attorney of Spartanburg County, South Carolina. He was a member of the South Carolina House of Representatives 1907-1908. He served by special appointment as circuit judge and as associate justice of the Supreme Court of South Carolina. He also organized and was captain for three years of Company I, First Regiment, South Carolina National Guard Infantry.

Nicholls was elected as a Democrat to the Sixty-fourth Congress to fill the vacancy caused by the resignation of Joseph T. Johnson. He was reelected to the Sixty-fifth and Sixty-sixth Congresses and served from September 14, 1915 to March 3, 1921 and declined to be a candidate for renomination in 1920. He resumed the practice of law in Spartanburg, South Carolina until his death there on November 23, 1937. He is buried in West Oakwood Cemetery.

References

1885 births
1937 deaths
Wofford College alumni
Virginia Tech alumni
University of Chicago Law School alumni
Burials in South Carolina
Politicians from Spartanburg, South Carolina
Democratic Party members of the United States House of Representatives from South Carolina
20th-century American politicians